Bindnagle Evangelical Lutheran Church is a historic Evangelical Lutheran church located in North Londonderry Township, Lebanon County, Pennsylvania. It is in the Georgian style. Also on the property is a contributing cemetery, with the oldest burial dated to 1774.

It was added to the National Register of Historic Places in 1975.

References

External links

Welcome to PalmyraPA.com: Historic Bindnagle
History of the Bindnagle Evangelical Lutheran Church YouTube video

Churches completed in 1803
19th-century Lutheran churches in the United States
Churches on the National Register of Historic Places in Pennsylvania
Georgian architecture in Pennsylvania
Churches in Lebanon County, Pennsylvania
National Register of Historic Places in Lebanon County, Pennsylvania